Ski Sundown is a ski area located in New Hartford, Connecticut. There are 16 trails, 15 of which are lighted for nighttime skiing.  In terms of difficulty, eight of the trails are easier, four are intermediate and three are difficult and one is most difficult.  Popular trails include Tom's Treat, which winds its way down the mountain for one mile and includes a mini terrain park (1.6 km), and Gunbarrel, a steep pitch straight down the fall line which offers free NASTAR as well as CISC-sponsored races.  The ski area features two terrain parks, the easier on Tom's Treat, and an expert terrain park on the black diamond run Stinger. When there is enough snow, the mountain seeds moguls on the Exhibition and Gunbarrel trails. The mountain opened its newest trail, Satan's Stairway, a double black diamond trail in the Winter 2014/2015 season.  Five lifts service the mountain, with three triple chairs, and two conveyor lifts.  Ski Sundown has  of skiable terrain. Ski Sundown also includes 15 out of 16 trails lighted for night skiing, usually until 10 PM (12 am on New Year's Eve)

History
Satan's Ridge Ski Area opened with a Hall T-Bar in 1963.  A second T-Bar would be added in 1965.  The area later closed, before being reopened as Ski Sundown by Channing Murdock, owner of nearby Butternut Basin Ski Area. In 1977, a new Borvig triple chairlift was installed to the summit, currently named the Exhibition Triple.  In 1987, a second summit triple chairlift, a CTEC now referred to as the Triple Barrel, was installed, replacing an earlier double chair.  In 2006 a conveyor lift called the Little Easy was added, and in 2013 a 300-foot conveyor lift was installed in the Sunnyside Learning area to replace an earlier double chair, called the Big Easy.

Mountain Statistics

Trails
 Ski Sundown features 16 trails spanning 70 skiable acres.
 - Easiest 50%
 - More Difficult 25%
 - Most Difficult: 25%

Lifts
Triples: 3
Ski Sundown features three Triple chairlifts. Their Triple Barrel and Exhibition Triple lifts run parallel to each other from base to summit, allowing skiers to access terrain on all levels. On weekdays or when crowds are light, only one of the summit chairs run, typically the Triple Barrel. Their third triple, the Sunnyside Express, services three beginner and intermediate level trails in the Sunnyside learning area. 
Surface Lifts: 2
The two surface lifts at Ski Sundown, the Little Easy and Big Easy magic carpets, provide an accessible way for beginner skiers to ascend the mountain. The Little Easy carpet services a small, fenced-off beginner area located next to Gunbarrel, while the Big  Easy carpet is longer and serves the entirety of the Little Joe, Breezeway, and Loop trails.

External links
 Ski Sundown

References 

Ski areas and resorts in Connecticut
Sports venues in Litchfield County, Connecticut
New Hartford, Connecticut